Creu Casas i Sicart (Barcelona, April 26, 1913 – Barcelona, May 20, 2007) was a Catalan biologist and botanist. After graduating from the University of Barcelona, she became a bryology specialist and started a large inventory of Catalan and European bryophytes. She wrote two important books on this subject Flora dels Briòfits dels Països Catalans (vol. I, 2001; vol. II, 2004) and Handbook of mosses of the Iberian Peninsula and the Balearic Islands (2006).

20th-century Spanish botanists
1913 births
2007 deaths
Spanish women botanists
Women bryologists
University of Barcelona alumni